The School of Naturalists or the School of Yin-Yang was a Warring States-era philosophy that synthesized the concepts of yin-yang and the Five Elements.

Overview
Zou Yan is considered the founder of this school. His theory attempted to explain the universe in terms of basic forces in nature: the complementary agents of yin (dark, cold, female, negative) and yang (light, hot, male, positive) and the Five Elements or Five Phases (water, fire, wood, metal, and earth).

In its early days, this theory was most strongly associated with the states of Yan and Qi. In later periods, these epistemological theories came to hold significance in both philosophy and popular belief.  This school was absorbed into the alchemic and magical dimensions of Taoism as well as into the Chinese medical framework. The earliest surviving recordings of this are in the Ma Wang Dui texts and Huang Di Nei Jing.

Figures
Zou Yan (305240 BCE) was a Chinese philosopher best known as the representative thinker of the Yin and Yang School (or School of Naturalists) during the Hundred Schools of Thought era in Chinese philosophy. Zou Yan was a noted scholar of the Jixia Academy in the state of Qi. Joseph Needham, a British biochemist and sinologist, describes Zou as "The real founder of all Chinese scientific thought." His teachings combined and systematized two current theories during the Warring States period: Yin-Yang and the Five Elements/Phases (wood, fire, earth, metal, and water).

During the Han dynasty, the concepts of the school were integrated into Confucian ideology, with Zhang Cang (253–152 BCE) and Dong Zhongshu (179–104 BCE) being the chief instrumental figures behind this process.

See also
 Metaphysical naturalism

References

Classical Chinese philosophy
Natural philosophy
Schools and traditions in ancient Chinese philosophy
Onmyōdō